Mark Charig (born 22 February 1944 in London) is a British trumpeter and cornetist.

He was particularly active in the late 1960s and early 1970s, when he played in settings as diverse as Long John Baldry's group, Bluesology, Soft Machine, and Keith Tippett's group and his Centipede big band. Charig also featured on several King Crimson albums, being particularly prominent in a long solo on the title track of Islands, on the title track of Lizard and on the track "Fallen Angel" on the Red album, as well as in a work-in-progress version of "Starless".

In the mid-1970s he also toured with the group Red Brass, which featured singer Annie Lennox. He also appeared with the Brotherhood of Breath and recorded with Mike Osborne, as well as releasing his own Pipedream LP on Ogun Records.

He is also a member of the London Jazz Composers' Orchestra. He now lives in Germany and is a member of the Wuppertal-based Conduction Orchestra.

More recently, he has recorded KJU: a CD of quartet improvisations with the group "Quatuohr".

Discography

As leader
 Pipedream with Keith Tippett, Ann Winter, (Ogun, 1977)
 Amore with Taya Fisher, Floros Floridis (J.N.D., 1985)
 Live in Mestre with Radu Malfatti, Evan Parker, Tony Rusconi (WM Boxes, 2011)
 Free Music On a Summer Evening with Jörg Fischer, Georg Wolf (sporeprint, 2014)

As sideman
With Maarten Altena
 Rif (Claxon, 1987)
 Quotl (hat ART, 1989)
 Cities & Streets (hat ART, 1991)

With Elton Dean
 Elton Dean (CBS, 1971)
 Oh! for the Edge (Ogun, 1976)
 Happy Daze (Ogun, 1977)
 Boundaries (Japo, 1980)
 Live at the BBC (Hux, 2003)
 Ninesense Suite (Jazzwerkstatt, 2011)
 The 100 Club Concert 1979 (Reel, 2012)

With Barry Guy/London Jazz Composers' Orchestra
 Ode (Incus, 1972)
 Zurich Concerts (Intakt, 1988)
 Harmos (Intakt, 1989)
 Double Trouble (Intakt, 1990)
 Theoria (Intakt, 1992)
 Portraits (Intakt, 1994)
 Three Pieces for Orchestra (Intakt, 1997)
 Double Trouble Two (Intakt, 1998)
 Study II/Stringer (Intakt, 2005)

With King Crimson
 Lizard (Island, 1970)
 Islands (Island, 1971)
 Red (Island, 1974)

With Chris McGregor
 Chris McGregor's Brotherhood of Breath (RCA/Neon, 1970)
 Brotherhood (RCA Victor, 1972)
 Live at Willisau (Ogun, 1974)
 Procession (Ogun, 1978)
 Yes Please (In and Out, 1981)
 Travelling Somewhere (Cuneiform, 2001)
 Bremen to Bridgwater (Cuneiform, 2004)
 Eclipse at Dawn (Cuneiform, 2008)

With Harry Miller
 Family Affair (Ogun, 1977)
 Down South (Varajazz, 1984)
 Full Steam Ahead (Reel, 2009)
 Different Times, Different Places (Ogun, 2013)

With Soft Machine
 Fourth (CBS, 1971)
 BBC Radio 1 Live in Concert (Windsong, 1972)
 The Peel Sessions (Strange Fruit, 1990)
 Fourth/Fifth (Columbia, 1999)
 Backwards (Cuneiform, 2002)
 BBC Radio 1967–1971 (Hux, 2003)

With Keith Tippett
 You Are Here...I Am There (Polydor, 1970)
 Dedicated to You, But You Weren't Listening (Vertigo, 1971)
 Frames Music for an Imaginary Film (Ogun, 1978)
 A Loose Kite in a Gentle Wind Floating with Only My Will for an Anchor (Ogun, 1986)
 Live at Le Mans (Red Eye, 2007)

With others
 Graham Bell, Graham Bell (Charisma, 1972)
 Centipede, Septober Energy (RCA/Neon, 1971)
 Bob Downes, Hells Angels (Openian, 1975)
 Julie Driscoll, 1969 (Polydor, 1971)
 Eddy Grant, Eddy Grant (Torpedo, 1975)
 Hugh Hopper, Hopper Tunity Box (Compendium, 1977)
 Reg King, Reg King (United Artists, 1971)
 Didier Levallet, Scoop (In and Out, 1983)
 Mike Osborne, Marcel's Muse (Ogun, 1977)
 Soft Heap, Soft Heap (Charly, 1979)
 Julie Tippetts, Sunset Glow (Utopia, 1975)
 Gary Windo, His Master's Bones (Cuneiform, 1996)
 Gary Windo, Anglo American (Cuneiform, 2004)
 Robert Wyatt, The End of an Ear (CBS, 1970)

References

External links
Biography at Calyx, the Canterbury website

1944 births
Living people
British jazz trumpeters
Male trumpeters
Soft Machine members
Canterbury scene
British rhythm and blues boom musicians
Centipede (band) members
21st-century trumpeters
21st-century British male musicians
British male jazz musicians
Brotherhood of Breath members
Bluesology members